The Grant (formerly One Museum Park West) is the companion structure to One Museum Park in the Near South Side community area (neighborhood) in Chicago, Illinois, USA. It is located at the north end of the Central Station development.

Overview

Museum Park is a complex of multiple residential towers within the Central Station development at the southern edge of Grant Park, across Lake Shore Drive from Chicago's Museum Campus. Construction of The Grant followed the 62-story One Museum Park, directly to the east. In 2006, the Prairie District Neighborhood Alliance, a non-profit organization was formed to provide representation for thousands of South Loop residents, including the Prairie District, Central Station and Museum Park, Motor Row, the South Michigan Ave Corridor, as well as other areas of the Near South Side.

In July 2012, the building was acquired by New York-based Related Companies along with the former 1600 Museum Park and Museum Park Place 2 and later renamed The Grant, Adler Place and Harbor View. Nearly all of the 238 unsold units in the building were sold by May 2015.

Education
The building is zoned to schools in the Chicago Public Schools.

 South Loop Elementary School
 Phillips Academy High School

Gallery

See also
List of buildings
List of skyscrapers
List of tallest buildings in Chicago
List of tallest buildings in the United States
World's tallest structures

References

External links 
 
Emporis listing
Prairie District Neighborhood Alliance website
Google Earth Model

Residential buildings completed in 2010
Residential skyscrapers in Chicago
Residential condominiums in Chicago
2010 establishments in Illinois